The  1999 Big 12 Championship Game was a college football game played on Saturday, December 4, 1999, at the Alamodome in San Antonio. This was the 4th Big 12 Championship Game and determined the 1999 champion of the Big 12 Conference. The game featured the Nebraska Cornhuskers, champions of the North division, and the Texas Longhorns, champions of the South division. Both teams had faced each other earlier in the regular season, with the Longhorns defeating the Cornhuskers 24–20. However in the rematch in the championship game, Nebraska would defeat them 22–6 and secure the Big 12 title.

Teams

Nebraska

Texas

Game summary

Statistics

See also
 Nebraska–Texas football rivalry

References

Championship Game
Big 12 Championship Game
Nebraska Cornhuskers football games
Texas Longhorns football games
American football competitions in San Antonio
December 1999 sports events in the United States
1999 in sports in Texas